Jerry L. Denbo (April 24, 1950 – February 24, 2014) was an American businessman, educator, and politician.

Born in Bedford, Indiana, he received his bachelor's and master's degrees from Indiana University Bloomington and taught school. He also sold insurance. Denbo also developed the hotels in French Lick, Indiana and in West Baden Springs, Indiana. He served in the Indiana House of Representatives, as a Democrat. from 1990 to 2007. He died in French Lick, Indiana.

Notes

1950 births
2014 deaths
People from Bedford, Indiana
Businesspeople from Indiana
Indiana University Bloomington alumni
Democratic Party members of the Indiana House of Representatives
People from French Lick, Indiana
20th-century American businesspeople